Sandtoft Priory was a priory  in Lincolnshire, England.

References

Monasteries in Lincolnshire